The Indo British Film Co was a film production company set up by Dhirendra Nath Ganguly in 1918.

Bengali Ownership
It was the first Bengali-owned production company in India.

First Film Made
The first production by the company was Bilat Ferat in 1921, directed by Nitish Chandra Laharry.

External links
The Pioneer from Manikganj & Zindabahar.

Film production companies based in Bangalore
Indian companies established in 1918